Alexander "Sasha" Okun (born 12 May 1949) is an Israeli artist, author and educator. He is best known for his work in the medium of painting and has been called the Hanoch Levin of Israeli art. Okun's art is characterised for its reference to classical baroque traditions, which he identifies as tragic comedy in the tragicomic absurd perspective. He is a senior lecturer at Bezalel Academy of Arts in Jerusalem, where he has taught for more than 30 years.

Biography

Okun was born in 1949 in Saint Petersburg (then Leningrad), USSR. From 1961 to 1964, he began painting in the studio Solomon Levin at the Palace of Pioneers. Okun studied at Art School 190 from 1964 to 1966. Okun later studied at Stieglitz State Art and Industry Academy, where he graduated with Master of Arts in 1971. He taught drawing at the Art School Number 2 and in the House of Pioneers in Leningrad from 1972 to 1976.

During this time, Okun was also a member of the "Alef" section of the underground art movement. He exhibited at the first exhibition of non-conformist art in the "Gaza" Palace of Culture. Okun also exhibited at the "Nievsky" Palace of Culture in Leningrad, as well as in the Museums of Contemporary Art in Erevan (Armenia) and museums and galleries in the United States. He immigrated to Israel in 1979.

"The superb painterly qualities of the paintings link Okun to the European post-Renaissance tradition. Okun’s paintings neither reflect nor imitate. They walk a fine line between caricature and the grotesque, but do not stoop to crudity. His works have been rightly compared to frescoes in terms of the sensation they create. We can think of Giulio Romano’s Hall of the Giants in the Palazzo del Te, Mantua, from the 16th century, or some of the figures in the San Antonio della Florida in Madrid by Goya (1799), both wall paintings full of fantasy and severity."[4]
Okun has been the illustrator of many books of I. Guberman, B. Kamyanov and S. Schwartzband.

Beginning in 1986, Okun taught drawing at the Bezalel Academy of Art in Jerusalem, where he is senior lecturer at this time. From 1988 to 2001, he taught drawing and painting at Emunah College in Jerusalem. By the late 1980s, Okun collaborated with Igor Guberman to broadcast "Eight and a Half" on Israel Radio. He also worked with Guberman to create the Israeli television programme "On Three", which was released in 2003.

Authorship

Okun translated Elie Wiesel's Souls on Fire into Russian. The book was first published underground in 1979 and has been published three times. He published his book The Book of Tasty and Healthy Life (2002), The Guide to the Country of the Elders of Zion (2009), which were co-authored by Guberman. He has also published Culinary Midrash (2000), Placebo (2007), Kamov and Kaminka (2015) and Romance with a pencil (2019). Okun has also illustrated of books for Guberman, Boris Kamyanov and Sholom Schwartzbard.

Awards and recognition

Okun has been recognized internationally for this work. During the 1980s, he received the Ofer Feniger Award and scholarships from Gestetners and the International Centre for Arts Cité in Paris. He was named an Honorary Citizen of Jefferson County, Kentucky in 1989. In 2014, Okun received the Mordechai Ish Shalom prize for Achievements in Art.

Collections

Okun's works are represented in private collections in Australia, Austria, Canada, France, Israel, Italy, Mexico, Poland, the Netherlands, Russia and the United States, as well as in museums in Russia, Israel and Austria. The most notable venues include Stieglitz State Art and Industry Academy, the Museum of the Non-conformist Art and the Russian Museum in Saint Petersburg, State Hermitage in Saint Petersburg, Yad Vashem, the Israel Museum in Jerusalem, the Tel Aviv Museum of Art, the Albertina Museum & Art Gallery in Vienna, the Negev Museum in Be'er Sheva, the Janko Da-Da Museum in Ein Hod, the Illana Goor Museum in Jaffa, the Bar David Museum in Bar Am and the Tefen Open Museum in Galilee.

Selected exhibitions
2022 – exhibition  of multiple works from Albertina permanent collection, Albertina, Vienna
2019 – "Where Art Thou", State Russia Museum, St. Petersburg
2018 – "Summer Exhibition", Royal Academy of Arts, London
2017 – Albertina, Vienna
2016 – "Harmony and Dissonance", Gallery U & I, London
2014 – Winners of the Ish Shalom prize exhibited at Gallery "Agripas 12" Jerusalem
2014 – Museum of Fine Arts, Vitebsk, Belarus
2013 – "Master and Disciple", together with Asya Lukin at Gallery "Nora"
2013 – Contemporary Israeli Art Museum, Ramat Gan
2011 – Gallery Bait Adom, Tel Aviv – Yafo 
2010 – Paddington Central, London
2006 – Artists House, Jerusalem
2005 – Basis Gallery, Adassa Neurim
2000 – Contemporary Israeli Art Museum, Ramat Gan
1999 – The Open Museum, Tefen, Galilee
1998 – Gallery Nora, Jerusalem
1994 – Janko Da-Da Museum, Ein Hod
1994 – Museum of Fine Arts, Ein Harod
1992 – Israel Museum, Jerusalem
1988 – Jerusalem Theater
1987, 1989 – Horace Richter Gallery, Tel Aviv – Yafo
1987 – Cite des Arts, Paris
1985 – The Jewish Museum, New York
1981–1983, 1985, 1986, 1988 – Debel Gallery, Jerusalem

References

6. Ilia Rodov, Lecture on Poetics of Obscenity in Contemporary Israeli Art: Grobman, Okun, Gamburd at the Hebrew University of Jerusalem, 4 November 2019

External links

1949 births
Living people
Israeli artists